An ice hockey arena (or ice hockey venue, or ice hockey stadium) is a sport venue in which an ice hockey competition is held. Alternatively it is used for other sports such as broomball, ringette and rink bandy.

Multi-purpose arenas
A number of ice hockey arenas were also designed for use by multiple types of sport, such as basketball. In many of these multi-purpose arenas, such as the United Center in Chicago and the Staples Center in Los Angeles, an insulated plywood floor is placed, piece-by-piece, on top of the ice surface, and then the basketball court boards are placed over that.

Notable examples

This list is incomplete. See the link above for a more complete list.

Arena names with an asterisk (*) after their city name means that it has either been demolished or is no longer used by any ice hockey teams.

Canada
 The Montreal Forum in Montreal* was the home of 24 Stanley Cup Champions
 The Bell Centre in Montreal is the largest hockey arena of the National Hockey League.
 Scotiabank Saddledome in Calgary was expandable to IIHF rink dimensions
 Rogers Arena in Vancouver hosted the 2010 Winter Olympics Men's Hockey Gold Medal match (originally General Motors Place)
 Maple Leaf Gardens in Toronto* is now partially occupied by the Ryerson Rams' athletic centre, with the remainder housing a Loblaws supermarket
 Scotiabank Arena in Toronto (formerly known as Air Canada Centre)
 Rogers Place in Edmonton
 Canadian Tire Centre in Ottawa (originally The Palladium; later known as Corel Centre and Scotiabank Place)
 Canada Life Centre in Winnipeg
 Videotron Centre in Quebec City

United States

 Madison Square Garden in New York City is "The World's Most Famous Arena"
 Chicago Stadium in Chicago* was "The Madhouse on Madison"
 United Center in Chicago, the replacement for Chicago Stadium
 Staples Center in Los Angeles
 PPG Paints Arena in Pittsburgh
 Matthews Arena, in Boston, the world's oldest indoor ice hockey venue still in use (opened 1910), hosts the Northeastern Huskies collegiate hockey teams
 Boston Garden in Boston* (1928–1995) had an undersized rink because it was built when the NHL had no regulation rink specifications
 Appleton Arena in Canton, New York has been home of the St. Lawrence University Skating Saints since opening in 1950
 TD Garden in Boston, capacity of 17,565 for Bruins games
 Xcel Energy Center in Saint Paul
 Ball Arena in Denver
 American Airlines Center in Dallas
 BB&T Center in the Miami suburb of Sunrise, Florida 
 Bridgestone Arena in Nashville
 Honda Center in Anaheim
 KeyBank Center in Buffalo
 Gila River Arena in the Phoenix suburb of Glendale, Arizona
 Nassau Veterans Memorial Coliseum in Uniondale
 Nationwide Arena in Columbus
 Prudential Center in Newark, known as "The Rock"
 SAP Center at San Jose in San Jose
 Enterprise Center in St. Louis
 Amalie Arena in Tampa
 Capital One Arena in Washington
 Wells Fargo Center in Philadelphia
 T-Mobile Arena on the Las Vegas Strip
 Little Caesars Arena in Detroit
 PNC Arena in Raleigh
 Ingalls Rink at Yale University in New Haven, Connecticut

Finland
Helsinki Halli in Helsinki
Tampere Deck Arena in Tampere

Germany
Lanxess Arena in Cologne

Czech Republic 
O2 Arena in Prague

Russia
Megasport Arena in Moscow

Sweden
Ericsson Globe in Stockholm
Scandinavium in Gothenburg

Switzerland
PostFinance Arena in Bern

Italy
The Stadio Olympica in Cortina d'Ampezzo was the main venue of the 1956 Winter Olympics.
The Palasport Olimpico in Turin was the main venue of the 2006 Winter Olympics.

United Kingdom

Odyssey Arena in Belfast
Braehead Arena in Glasgow
National Ice Centre in Nottingham
iceSheffield in Sheffield
Sheffield Arena in Sheffield
Fife Ice Arena in Kirkcaldy
SkyDome Arena in Coventry
Dundee Ice Arena in Dundee
Murrayfield Ice Rink in Edinburgh
Altrincham Ice Dome in Altrincham
Blackburn Arena in Blackburn
Manchester Arena in Manchester* was home to Manchester Storm (1995–2002 – Relaunched in 2015 playing at Altrincham Ice Dome)
Ice Arena Wales in Cardiff

Gallery

See also
List of ice hockey arenas by capacity
Ice hockey rink

References

External links

Ice Hockey Arena
Hockeyarenas.net Information about ice hockey arenas from around the world
rinktime.com A directory of Ice Hockey Arenas Throughout North America established 1997

 *
Arena